Louis Amateis, American sculptor born in Turin, Italy on December 13, 1855. Studying architecture at Istituto Italiano di Tecnologia and sculpture at the Royal Academy of Fine Art. He also studied in Milan and Paris before moving to New York City in 1884. While working as an architectural sculptor for McKim, Mead, and White he married his wife, Dora Ballin, in 1889. After getting married, the couple and their four sons moved to Washington, D.C. where he founded the School of Architecture and Fine Arts at what became George Washington University. He served as chairman from 1892 to 1902.  He died March 18, 1913, of apoplexy. His son, Edmond, went on to be a prominent sculptor as well.

Amateis was a member of the National Sculpture Society.

Works
 Amateis has designed work for the United States Capitol and busts of Chester A. Arthur, General Winfield Scott Hancock, General John Logan, Andrew Carnegie among others.
 Amateis Doors, Capitol Building
 Heurich Mausoleum ca. 1895
 Texas Heroes Monument in Galveston, Texas
 Spirit of the Confederacy, Houston, Texas
 Call to Arms, Corsicana, Texas ; ca. 1907-08

References

Italian emigrants to the United States
1855 births
1913 deaths
20th-century Italian sculptors
20th-century Italian male artists
19th-century Italian sculptors
19th-century Italian male artists
Italian male sculptors
20th-century American sculptors
20th-century American male artists
19th-century American sculptors
19th-century American male artists
American male sculptors
Deaths from bleeding